Les Rogers may refer to:

Les Rogers (footballer) (1896–1916), Australian rules footballer
Les Rogers (curler), Canadian curler
Les Rogers (rugby league), Australian rugby league footballer

See also
Lesley Rogers, figure skater in 1997 World Figure Skating Championships
Leslie Rogers (disambiguation)